Sarah and Son is a 1930 pre-Code American drama film directed by Dorothy Arzner. The screenplay by Zoë Akins was adapted from Timothy Shea's novel of the same name. It stars Ruth Chatterton, Fredric March, Gilbert Emery, and Doris Lloyd. It was filmed at Paramount Studios in Los Angeles and released by Paramount Pictures.

Plot
Sarah Storm, an Austrian immigrant, has taken up with Jim Grey, with the goal of both of them becoming vaudeville entertainers. Months after their stage debut, they now have a baby boy and no steady income, and Jim expresses little interest in finding work or supporting the family. After a fight with Sarah, Jim tries to get a loan from John Ashmore, a wealthy businessman, who denies his request, but mentions his envy at Jim's fatherhood, since his wife cannot bear children. On a whim, Jim enlists with the Marines for four years, and goes drinking. After returning home and quarreling again with Sarah, he disappears with their young son Bobby, intending to sell him to the Ashmores. The heartbroken Sarah is given a job singing with an itinerant musician, Cyril Belloc.

Two years later, Cyril and Sarah perform for WWI veterans in a hospital. As she goes among the beds of the wounded soldiers, she finds Jim there, near death. He begs forgiveness for his actions, and tells her about giving her son to the Ashmores. When she pleads with John Ashmore to let her see if their son is hers, Ashmore refuses, threatening to have her committed; their attorney, Howard Vanning, who is also Ashmore's brother-in-law, takes pity on her and says he will try to help, but also believes her delusional. Sarah leaves America for Germany to pursue her singing career.
 
Years later, Sarah has become an internationally famous opera singer, and returns to New York to perform. She reconnects with Vanning, declares she is no longer afraid of any threats the Ashmores can levy against her, and again demands to meet the boy, saying a birthmark will prove her is her son. Meanwhile, Bobby is now 13, and unhappy with the too-protective Ashmores, confiding to his uncle Howard that he fears being incapable of being a self-sufficient man. Still refusing to agree to a meeting, Mrs. Ashmore presents in his stead the deaf mute son of one of their servants, hoping this will convince Sarah he is not her son. Bobby, unbeknownst to his adoptive parents, runs away to the summer house of his uncle Howard. Howard, who is now fully in love with Sarah, brings her to the house unaware of Bobby's presence, and finally engineers an encounter between them.

Cast
 Ruth Chatterton as Sarah Storm
 Fredric March as Howard Vanning
 Fuller Mellish Jr. as Jim Grey
 Gilbert Emery as John Ashmore
 Doris Lloyd as Mrs. Ashmore (Vanning's sister)
 William Stack as Cyril Belloc
 Philippe De Lacy as Bobby

Mellish died on February 8, 1930, shortly before the movie's release.

Reception
The New York Times praised the performances and most of the screenplay, faulting only some aspects of plot development. It offered as praise: "Sarah and Son is one of the few audible pictures which are really good enough to warrant criticism of the development of the story, and no matter what are its minor shortcomings, it is an emphatically ingratiating entertainment."

Awards
 Ruth Chatterton was nominated for the Academy Award for Best Actress for her performance in Sarah and Son. Her character's evolution from an immigrant with a strong Austrian accent to a successful celebrity with just a trace of an accent appeared alongside Greta Garbo's heavily accented performance in her first talkie.

References

External links

1930 films
1930s English-language films
American black-and-white films
1930 drama films
Films directed by Dorothy Arzner
Paramount Pictures films
Films based on American novels
American drama films
Films about domestic violence
1930s American films
English-language drama films